Carl August Röckel (1 December 1814 – 18 June 1876) was a German composer and conductor. He was a friend of Richard Wagner and active in the Revolutions of 1848.

Biography
Röckel was born in Graz. His father, Joseph August Röckel, was a tenor, choir director and theatre entrepreneur who sang the role of Florestan at the premiere of the second version of Ludwig van Beethoven's Fidelio in 1806. With his father, he experienced theatrical life in Vienna, Paris and London. He acted in Paris as assistant to Gioacchino Rossini at the Théâtre des Italiens, and was on a later visit to Paris an eyewitness to the Paris "July revolution" of 1830.

After he completed his musical training with his uncle, Johann Nepomuk Hummel (who was married to his father's sister Elisabeth Röckel), he was music director in Bamberg starting in 1838. He lived in Vienna from 1839. For several years after 1840 he was conductor at the Weimar Court Theatre, where he composed his opera Farinelli. In 1843 he came to Dresden, where he was at the Court Theatre, where Richard Wagner was music director. He was assistant conductor ("2. Musikdirektor") to Wagner for five years until 1848. Influenced by the music of Wagner, he renounced a performance of his own opera, which he had sent to Dresden. Wagner became a close friend, especially during the time of 1849 Dresden uprising, and the two would go on long walks together.

Röckel was an ardent Republican; he became friends with the likes of Michael Bakunin and was the editor of the revolutionary journal in Dresden, Volksblätter, to which Wagner also contributed. After the failure of the uprising, Röckel was captured along with Bakunin and sentenced to death, while Wagner escaped to Zurich. The death sentences were later commuted to prison terms. Whilst Bakunin was handed over to Russia, Röckel had to serve a thirteen-year sentence in solitary confinement at the Königstein Fortress and at Waldheim, and was only released in January 1862, the last of the May insurgents to be freed.

While in custody, he received many letters from Wagner, in which Wagner made insightful statements on his opera cycle Der Ring des Nibelungen, which give valuable background to the revolutionary and socially critical nature of Wagner's magnum opus. During detention Rockel wrote his book The Saxon Revolt and the Waldheim Penitentiary. In 1862 in Biebrich he once more met Wagner, who at that time was living there, writing Die Meistersinger von Nürnberg. However Wagner later quarrelled with Röckel when, in the late 1860s, he believed that the latter had been gossiping about his relationship with Cosima von Bülow.

Röckel lived in Frankfurt from 1863. In 1866, he moved to Munich, and later in Vienna. In 1871 he suffered a stroke from which he never recovered. He finally died after a long illness at the house of his son in Budapest.

Literature 
 Riemann, Hugo (1916), Musiklexikon (8th edition). Max Hesses Verlag, Berlin-Leipzig, p. 936.
 Squire, William Barclay and James Deauville (n.d.), 'August Röckel', in Oxford Music Online (subscription only). Retrieved 25 January 2013

References

External links 
 
Personennachlass Carl August Röckel Nachlass in the Dresden State Archives 

1814 births
1876 deaths
19th-century classical composers
19th-century German musicians
19th-century conductors (music)
German conductors (music)
German male classical composers
German male conductors (music)
German opera composers
German prisoners sentenced to death
German Romantic composers
Male opera composers
People of the Revolutions of 1848
Richard Wagner